This is the discography of British rock band Spear of Destiny.

Albums

Studio albums

Live albums

Compilation albums

Box sets

Video albums

Other albums

Singles

References

Discographies of British artists
Rock music group discographies